Interpretive dance is a family of modern dance styles that began around 1900 with Isadora Duncan. It used classical concert music but marked a departure from traditional concert dance. It seeks to translate human emotions, conditions, situations or fantasies into movement and dramatic expression, or else adapts traditional ethnic movements into more modern expressions. 

The effect of interpretive dance can be seen in many Broadway musicals as well as in other media. While it was—and most often, still is—thought of as a performing art, interpretive dance does not have to be performed with music. It often includes grandiloquent movements of the arms, turns and drops to the floor. It is frequently enhanced by lavish costumes, ribbons or spandex body suits.

See also
 Dance improvisation
 Free dance
 Lyrical dance

References

Free and improvised dance